Proteasome inhibitors are drugs that block the action of proteasomes, cellular complexes that break down proteins. They are being studied in the treatment of cancer; and three are approved for use in treating multiple myeloma.

Mechanism
Multiple mechanisms are likely to be involved, but proteasome inhibition may prevent degradation of pro-apoptotic factors such as the p53 protein, permitting activation of programmed cell death in neoplastic cells dependent upon suppression of pro-apoptotic pathways. For example, bortezomib causes a rapid and dramatic change in the levels of intracellular peptides.

Examples
 The first non-peptidic proteasome inhibitor discovered was the natural product lactacystin.
 Disulfiram has been proposed as another proteasome inhibitor. 
 Epigallocatechin-3-gallate has also been proposed.
 Marizomib (salinosporamide A) has started clinical trials for multiple myeloma.
 Oprozomib (ONX-0912), delanzomib (CEP-18770) have also started clinical trials. 
 Epoxomicin is a naturally occurring selective inhibitor.
 MG132 is a synthesized peptide commonly used for in vitro studies.
 Beta-hydroxy beta-methylbutyrate is a proteasome inhibitor in human skeletal muscle in vivo.

Approved medications
 Bortezomib (Velcade) was approved in 2003. This was the first proteasome inhibitor approved for use in the U.S. Its boron atom binds the catalytic site of the 26S proteasome.   
 Carfilzomib (Kyprolis) was approved by the FDA for relapsed and refractory multiple myeloma in 2012 . It irreversibly binds to and inhibits the chymotrypsin-like activity of the 20S proteasome.  
 Ixazomib (Ninlaro) was approved by the FDA in 2015 for use in combination with lenalidomide and dexamethasone for the treatment of multiple myeloma after at least one prior therapy. It is the first orally-available proteasome inhibitor

References